Kadavanad Kuttikrishnan (10 October 1925 – 19 August 1992) was a Malayalam–language poet and journalist from Kerala state, South India. He received the Kerala Sahitya Akademi Award in the year 1978 for his poetry work Suprabhatham.

Biography
Kuttikrishnan was born in 1925 in Kadavanad village near Ponnani in Kerala as the son of Arumukhan and Devaki. After completing his education from Puthuponnani Mappila Elementary School, Ponnani BEM School and A.V. Highschool, he worked in Grain Purchasing Office and Premier Hosiery Works in Kozhikode. Kadavanad Kuttikrishnan worked in Pourasakthi and Janavani newspapers before joining the Hind newspaper (published from Kozhikode) as assistant editor. He later worked in Mathrubhumi and Malayala Manorama. He, along with V. T. Bhattathiripad, Edasseri Govindan Nair, Uroob and N. Damodaran, was a patron of the famed Ponnani Kendra Kala Samithi, a socio-cultural union based in Ponnani. He received the Kerala Sahitya Akademi Award in the year 1978 for his poetry work Suprabhatham. He retired as assistant editor from Malayala Manorama in 1983 and then served as a member of the editorial committee of Bhashaposhini magazine. He died on 19 August 1992. He was survived by his wife Yasoda.

Works
 Kalimuttam
 Suprabhatham
 Wayanadinte Omana

References

1925 births
1992 deaths
Journalists from Kerala
Malayali people
People from Malappuram district
Poets from Kerala
Malayalam-language writers
Malayalam poets
Malayalam-language journalists
Recipients of the Kerala Sahitya Akademi Award
20th-century Indian poets
Indian male poets
20th-century Indian male writers